Garen Casey is an Australian former professional rugby league footballer who played in the 1990s. He was the Australian Schoolboys Captain in 1992 touring New Zealand.

Success in Both Hemispheres
Garen Casey played  and scored a try and two goals in Wakefield Trinity’s 24-22 victory over the Featherstone Rovers in the 1998 First Division Grand Final at McAlpine Stadium, Huddersfield on Saturday 26 September 1998.

Casey attended Fairfield Patrician Brothers, a renowned rugby league high school and starred at 5/8 against Harristown State High(Qld) in the 1992 Commonwealth Bank Cup Grand Final.

Casey started the USA Women's Rugby League Inc who were the first official organization to represent the USA for Women's Rugby League. He continues to develop the game in the USA with his eyes on future successes in the shortened 9s format and player developments at the High Performance Level.

References

External links
Rugby league: Harvey on his way to take over at Salford

1974 births
Living people
Australian rugby league players
Parramatta Eels players
Penrith Panthers players
Place of birth missing (living people)
Salford Red Devils players
Wakefield Trinity players
Rugby league five-eighths